= Arthur Gimblett =

Welsh footballer

Personal information
- Full name: Arthur John Gimblett
- Date of birth: 1889
- Place of birth: Merthyr Tydfil, Wales
- Date of death: 1957 (aged 67–68)
- Height: 5 ft 11 in (1.80 m)
- Position: Winger

Senior career*
Years	Team	Apps	(Gls)
1911–1913	Merthyr Town		
1913–1914	Grimsby Town	4	(0)
- * Club domestic league appearances and goals

Arthur John Gimblett (1889–1957) was a Welsh professional footballer who played as a winger.

Born on 6 February 1889 in Merthyr, he played for Morriston, Swansea (1911), Bolton Wanderers (Oct '11), Merthyr Town & Grimsby Town.

During the Great War, he joined the 1st Welsh (Howitzer) Brigade, Royal Field Artillery at Swansea as a Gunner on 17 March 1915, giving his occupation as Medical Student. After fighting on the Somme, he was commissioned as a Second Lieutenant in the Royal Garrison Artillery in 1917 and seriously wounded in 1918.
